The Colorado Education Association (CEA) is a statewide federation of teacher and educational workers' labor unions in the state of Colorado in the United States. The CEA is a voluntary membership organization of 40,000 K-12 teachers and education support professionals, higher education faculty and support professionals, retired educators, and students preparing to become teachers. The CEA is a state affiliate of the National Education Association (NEA), America's oldest and largest organization dedicated to advancing the cause of public education.
 Colorado Student Assessment Program

External links
 Colorado Education Association
 CEA Board of Directors
 National Education Association

UniServ Units
 Aurora-Littleton
 Boulder-Westminster
 Central Adams
 Colorado Springs
 Denver
 Front Range
 Jefferson County
 Northern Colorado
 Northeast
 Pikes Peak
 San Juan
 San Luis
 Ski Country
 Southeast
 Spanish Peaks
 Two Rivers
 West Central

Local Affiliates
 Academy Education Association
 Aurora Education Association
 Boulder Valley Education Association
 Jefferson County Education Association
 Littleton Education Association
 Pueblo Education Association

Education trade unions
National Education Association
Education in Colorado
State wide trade unions in the United States